Poland participated in the ninth Winter Paralympics in 2006 in Turin, Italy. 

Poland entered eleven athletes in the following sports:

Alpine skiing: 4 male
Nordic skiing: 4 male, 3 female

Medalists

Alpine skiing

Biathlon

Cross-country skiing

See also
2006 Winter Paralympics
Poland at the 2006 Winter Olympics

External links
Torino 2006 Paralympic Games
International Paralympic Committee
Polski Komitet Paraolimpijski
Wirtualna Polska portal's article about Katarzyna Rogowiec (in Polish)

2006
Nations at the 2006 Winter Paralympics
Winter Paralympics